David Leslie Mobley (born 24 August 1948) was an English professional footballer who played as a full-back.

Later played for Mossley in August 1979 and scored the winning goal for Mossley against Crewe Alexandra in 1980 FA Cup before retiring in 1981.

References

1948 births
Living people
Footballers from Oxford
English footballers
Association football fullbacks
Sheffield Wednesday F.C. players
Grimsby Town F.C. players
Altrincham F.C. players
English Football League players
Mossley A.F.C. players